The Bristol East by-election was a Parliamentary by-election held on 3 November 1911. The constituency returned one Member of Parliament (MP) to the House of Commons of the United Kingdom, elected by the first past the post voting system.

Vacancy
Rt Hon. Charles Hobhouse had been Liberal MP for Bristol East since 1900. In October 1911 he was made a member of Asquith's cabinet as Chancellor of the Duchy of Lancaster and in accordance with the practice at the time, was required to resign his seat and seek re-election.

Electoral history

Candidates
Given that this seat had been Liberal since it was created in 1885, it was not surprising that the Conservatives did not contest the seat. Walter Moore stood as an Independent.

Result
There was a collapse in voter turnout, perhaps due to the absence of an official Unionist candidate. Despite this, the Liberal share of the vote remained static;

Aftermath
A General Election was due to take place by the end of 1915. By the autumn of 1914, the following candidates had been adopted to contest that election;
Liberal Party: Charles Hobhouse
Independent Labour Party: Walter Ayles

Due to the outbreak of war, the election did not take place until 1918;

Britton was the endorsed candidate of the Coalition Government.

References 

1911 elections in the United Kingdom
1911 in England
East
Ministerial by-elections to the Parliament of the United Kingdom
20th century in Bristol
November 1911 events